Siikalatva sub-region is a subdivision of Northern Ostrobothnia and one of the Sub-regions of Finland since 2009.

Municipalities
 Haapavesi
 Pyhäntä
 Siikalatva

Politics
Results of the 2018 Finnish presidential election:

 Sauli Niinistö   49.2%
 Matti Vanhanen   17.6%
 Paavo Väyrynen   15.4%
 Laura Huhtasaari   7.4%
 Pekka Haavisto   4.6%
 Merja Kyllönen   4.0%
 Tuula Haatainen   1.5%
 Nils Torvalds   0.3%

Sub-regions of Finland
Geography of North Ostrobothnia